The 1998 WNBA Championship was the championship series of the 1998 WNBA season, and the conclusion of the season's playoffs. The Houston Comets, top-seeded team of the league, defeated the Phoenix Mercury, third-seeded team of the league, two games to one in a best-of-three series. This was Houston's second straight title.

The Comets made their second appearance in the Finals in two years. The Mercury appeared in the Finals for the first time in franchise history.

Going into the series, the Comets had won the only championship, being it only the second season of the league's existence.

The Comets' 27–3 record gave them home court advantage over Phoenix (19–11). The Comets lost game 1 in Phoenix, but won games 2 and 3 to take the series.

Road to the finals

Regular season series
The Houston Comets won 2 of the 3 games in the regular season series:

Game summaries
All times listed below are Eastern Daylight Time.

Game 1

Jennifer Gillom's basket in the lane with 8.9 seconds left gave the Phoenix Mercury a 54–51 victory over the Houston Comets in Game 1 of the WNBA Finals.

Gillom, who helped set up her go-ahead shot by blocking a shot by Houston's Kim Perrot on the previous possession, finished with 15 points on just 5-of-20 shooting. She also grabbed 10 rebounds.

The Mercury, who finished eight games behind the Comets in the Western Conference, can win the title with a victory at Houston on Saturday. Phoenix handed Houston its fourth loss all season (another also from Phoenix in the regular season).

League MVP Cynthia Cooper was a one-woman show for the Comets, finishing with 29 points. The rest of the team—which includes first-team All-WNBA choices Sheryl Swoopes and Tina Thompson—managed to hit just 10-of-41 shots.

Game 2

Cynthia Cooper scored 19 of her 27 points after halftime as the defending champion Houston Comets forced a decisive third game in the WNBA Finals with a 74-69 overtime victory over the Phoenix Mercury. Sheryl Swoopes added 14 points and 13 rebounds for the Comets, who host Game 3. Houston, which won 27 of 30 regular-season games, lost Game 1 at Phoenix and trailed 62-50 with 7:24 to play before staging a furious rally to save its season.

Michele Timms scored 21 points before fouling out in the final minute and reserve Kristi Harrower added a career-high 12 for Phoenix, which seemingly had taken control of the game with a 12–2 run midway through the second half. Jennifer Gillom, who averaged a team-high 20.8 points per game for the Mercury, scored just eight on 3-of-15 shooting.

Phoenix, which led almost the entire second half, held a 50–48 edge with 11:43 to go after Cooper sank a foul shot following a technical foul on Mercury coach Cheryl Miller, which seemed to light a spark under the Mercury.

Houston sensed the urgency and clawed back into the game. Yolanda Moore had a basket off an offensive rebound before Cooper added a free throw and eight-foot bank shot to make it 62–55 with 5:02 left.

Houston shot 43 percent (28-of-65) from the field and Thompson finished with 12 points and 12 rebounds. Cooper was 11-of-14 from the line. The Mercury shot just 38 percent (24-of-63) but did hit 7-of-15 three-point shots.

Game 3

The Houston Comets claimed their second straight WNBA championship, pulling away from the pesky Phoenix Mercury late in the second half and claiming an 80–71 victory in decisive Game 3.

After cruising through the regular season with a 27–3 record, the Comets were pushed to the limit by the Mercury after finishing eight games ahead of them in the Western Conference. In the end, however, Houston's trio of stars ensured the repeat.

League MVP Cynthia Cooper scored 23 points and Tina Thompson added 18. Sheryl Swoopes, nearly invisible for the first 30 minutes, had 11 points in the final 9:13 and finished with 16.

Michelle Griffiths scored a career-high 24 points and Jennifer Gillom had her best game of the series, netting 20. But Phoenix got nothing from Michele Timms, who finished with only two points—19 fewer than she had in Game 2.

The Comets have now won the only two WNBA championships.

Awards
1998 WNBA Champion: Houston Comets	
Finals MVP: Cynthia Cooper

Rosters

{| class="toccolours" style="font-size: 95%; width: 100%;"
|-
! colspan="2" style="background-color: #B22222; color: #D3D3D3; text-align: center;" | 1998 Houston Comets Finals roster
|- style="background-color: #D3D3D3;color: #FFFFFF; text-align: center;"
! Players !! Coaches
|-
| valign="top" |
{| class="sortable" style="background:transparent; margin:0px; width:100%;"
! Pos. !! # !! Nat. !! Name !! Height !! Weight !!class="unsortable"| !! From
|-

{| class="toccolours" style="font-size: 95%; width: 100%;"
|-
! colspan="2" style="background-color: #4B0082; color: #FFFF00; text-align: center;" | 1998 Phoenix Mercury Finals roster
|- style="background-color: #DC143C;color: #FFFFFF; text-align: center;"
! Players !! Coaches
|-
| valign="top" |
{| class="sortable" style="background:transparent; margin:0px; width:100%;"
! Pos. !! # !! Nat. !! Name !! Height !! Weight !!class="unsortable"| !! From
|-

References

Finals
Houston Comets
Phoenix Mercury
1998 in sports in Texas
1998 in sports in Arizona
Women's National Basketball Association Finals
August 1998 sports events in the United States
September 1998 sports events in the United States
1998 in Houston
1990s in Phoenix, Arizona
Basketball competitions in Houston
Basketball competitions in Phoenix, Arizona